Three Strikes is a situation comedy pilot from Jon Stewart's production company for Comedy Central.

A character-based comedy set in the world of minor league baseball, it was written by Alex Gregory and Peter Huyck, whose credits include King of the Hill, Frasier, The Larry Sanders Show and the Late Show with David Letterman.

Three Strikes is believed to be the first comedy pilot under Comedy Central's first-look deal with Stewart's Bus Boy Prods." The cast for the filmed pilot includes: Frank John Hughes, Adrian Martinez, Reno Wilson, Phil Hendrie, Toby Huss and Ken Jeong. When the show wasn't picked up, the creators put an episode on YouTube hoping it could find an audience there.

References

External links
Three Strikes details, IMDb.com 
Casting decisions, HollywoodReporter.com; accessed September 8, 2015.

2000s American television specials
Television series by Busboy Productions
Television pilots not picked up as a series